Carsen Twarynski (born November 24, 1997) is a Canadian professional ice hockey forward currently playing for the Coachella Valley Firebirds in the American Hockey League (AHL) while under contract to the Seattle Kraken of the National Hockey League (NHL). He played in the Western Hockey League for the Kelowna Rockets and Calgary Hitmen before being drafted by the Philadelphia Flyers in the 2016 NHL Entry Draft.

Early life
Twarynski was born on November 24, 1997, in St. Albert, Alberta, Canada to parents Kim and Rob. His older brother Brayden was also an athlete; he most recently played as a linebacker for the University of Saskatchewan Huskies.

Playing career

Junior
Growing up in Alberta, Twarynski played with Calgary’s Bow Valley Hockey Association until he reached Atom level, in which he transferred to the Blackfoot Chiefs Minor Hockey Association Pee-Wee team for two years. As he aged out of pee-wee, he competed with the Calgary Bantam AAA Blackhawks and the Calgary Bantam AAA Bisons of the Calgary Buffalo Hockey Associations. After going overlooked in the Western Hockey League (WHL) Bantam Draft, he played one season with the Okotoks Oilers in the Alberta Junior Hockey League and Midget-AAA Buffaloes in the Alberta Midget Hockey League before signing with the Calgary Hitmen as a 16-year-old. Twarynski recorded his first career WHL goal during a 9–2 win over the Lethbridge Hurricanes on September 29, 2014. During his first year of draft eligibility, Twarynski recorded 20 goals for a total of 45 points and described himself as a "power forward that is good two ways." As a result of his play, he drafted by the Philadelphia Flyers 82nd overall in the 2016 NHL Entry Draft.

After spending two seasons with the Hitmen, Twarynski was traded to the Kelowna Rockets in exchange for Jake Kryski on January 9, 2017. When reflecting on the trade, Twarynski said, "it was a good move. I was very happy and I think Kelowna has turned out the best, so I was very fortunate." Upon the conclusion of the season, Twarynski joined the Flyers' American Hockey League (AHL) affiliate, the Lehigh Valley Phantoms, but was returned to major junior hockey near the start of the 2017–18 season. In his first full season with the team, the Rockets made it to the Western Conference final before eliminated in six games by the Seattle Thunderbirds. On March 11, 2018, Twarynski concluded his major junior career by signing an entry-level contract with the Flyers.

Professional
After attending the Flyers' 2018–19 training camp, Twarynski was re-assigned to the Phantoms to start the season.  He made his NHL debut on October 4, 2019, which was played in Prague, Czech Republic as part of the NHL Global Series. Although he played the majority of the 2019-20 season with the Phantoms, Twarynski was included in the Flyers' training camp for the 2020 playoffs, but did not make the roster to travel with the team to the bubble.

On July 21, 2021, Twarynski was selected from the Flyers at the 2021 NHL Expansion Draft by the Seattle Kraken.

Career statistics

References

External links

1997 births
Calgary Hitmen players
Canadian ice hockey left wingers
Charlotte Checkers (2010–) players
Coachella Valley Firebirds players
Ice hockey people from Alberta
Kelowna Rockets players
Lehigh Valley Phantoms players
Living people
Okotoks Oilers players
Philadelphia Flyers draft picks
Philadelphia Flyers players
Sportspeople from St. Albert, Alberta